American songwriter, musician and bandleader Ike Turner released his first composition, "Rocket 88" in 1951. The single was credited to Jackie Brenston and his Delta Cats, who were actually Ike Turner and his Kings of Rhythm. The single reached number one on the Billboard R&B chart. It is known for the distinction of being considered the first rock and roll song. The song was inducted into the Blues Hall of Fame in 1991, and the Rock and Roll Hall of Fame Singles in 2018.

Between 1951 and 1955, Turner became a talent scout, session musician and production assistant for Sam Philips at Sun Records and the Bihari brothers at Modern Records. Turner, unaware of songwriter's royalties, also wrote new material, which the Bihari brothers copyrighted under their own name. Turner estimated he "wrote 78 hit records for the Biharis."

Turner's 1958 penned tune "Box Top" featured his vocalist Litte Ann who he later renamed Tina Turner. In 1960, Turner signed to Sue Records and formed the Ike & Tina Turner Revue. He wrote most of their early hits including "A Fool In Love," "I Idolize You," and "Poor Fool."

In 1961, Turner wrote the hit "I'm Blue (The Gong-Gong Song)" for the Ikettes which Billboard ranked #63 on their list of 100 Greatest Girl Group Songs of All Time.

Between 1963 and 1964, Turner formed the labels Sputnik, Sonja, Sony, Prann, Teena, and Innis which he released records from various artists he produced and wrote compositions for. Many songs Turner wrote were recorded multiple times by different vocalists in the Ike & Tina Turner Revue. The list below only includes the original version of songs released.

Songs

1950s

1960s

1970s

1980s

2000s

References 

Turner, Ike, List of songs written by